Buddleja ibarrensis is an endangered species endemic to a small area of Ecuador in the vicinity of Ibarra in subtropical or tropical moist montane forest at an elevation of 2,200 m threatened by deforestation. B. ibarrensis was first described and named by Norman.

Description
Buddleja ibarrensis is a shrub closely related to B. americana. The young branches are subquadrangular and tomentose, bearing elliptic leaves 8 – 15 cm long by 3.7 – 9 cm wide on 2 – 3 cm petioles membranaceous, glabrescent above, and tomentose below. The white or cream inflorescence 10 – 20 cm long by 7 – 18 cm wide comprises two or three orders of branches bearing cymules 1 – 2 cm in diameter each with 5 – 15 flowers. The funnelform corolla is 3.5 – 4 mm long.

Cultivation
The shrub is not known to be in cultivation.

References

ibarrensis
Flora of Ecuador
Flora of South America
Endangered plants
Taxonomy articles created by Polbot